Llorts is a village in Andorra, located in the parish of Ordino.

Main sights
Andorra's Iron Route runs between Llorts and La Cortinada, following the sites of Andorra's historic mining and iron working industries that were active in the 17th–19th centuries. On the edge of the village is a 19th-century iron mine, La Mina de Llorts, which is open as a tourist attraction.

References

Populated places in Andorra
Ordino